The 1953 election for Mayor of Los Angeles took place on April 7, 1953, with a run-off election on May 26, 1953. Incumbent Fletcher Bowron was defeated by Norris Poulson, a U.S. Representative.

Municipal elections in California, including Mayor of Los Angeles, are officially nonpartisan; candidates' party affiliations do not appear on the ballot.

Election 
Bowron had been the subject of various failed recall elections against him, including one in 1950 that said that Bowron was "guilty of 'false' representations or was 'grossly negligent' in his assurances [...] that he had rid the city of official corruption and organized crime." Along with Poulson, three other candidates joined to challenge Bowron, including Lloyd Aldrich who failed to win the runoff against Bowron in the previous election.  In the primary, Poulson and Bowron advanced to the runoff election, with Poulson gaining more votes than Bowron.

In the runoff election, Poulson defeated Bowron to become Mayor, ending Bowron's tenure of fourteen years.

Results

Primary election

General election

References and footnotes

External links
 Office of the City Clerk, City of Los Angeles

1953
Los Angeles
Los Angeles mayoral election
Mayoral election
Los Angeles mayoral election
Los Angeles mayoral election